Charles Frederick Pracht (October 20, 1880 – December 22, 1950) was a Republican member of the U.S. House of Representatives from Pennsylvania.

C. Frederick Pracht was born in Pitman, Pennsylvania.  He was associated in the toy novelty and notions business from 1897 to 1914.  He was children's agent and investigator in the county commissioner's office from 1915 to 1929, and served in the department of accounts under the clerk of quarters sessions in 1930 and 1931.  He was personal property assessor in the board of revision department from 1932 to 1942.  Pracht was member of the Republican executive ward committee since 1904, serving as chairman for twenty-five consecutive years.

Pracht was elected as a Republican to the 78th Congress, but was an unsuccessful candidate for reelection in 1944.

He died on December 22, 1950 and was interred at Lawnview Memorial Park in Rockledge, Pennsylvania.

References

1880 births
1950 deaths
Burials at Lawnview Memorial Park
People from Schuylkill County, Pennsylvania
Republican Party members of the United States House of Representatives from Pennsylvania
20th-century American politicians